is a Japanese cell biologist known for his identification of the cadherin class of adhesion molecules, which plays important roles in the construction of tissues. He shared the 2005 Japan Prize with Erkki Ruoslahti for "fundamental contribution in elucidating the molecular mechanisms of cell adhesion". 

He was selected as a Member of the Japan Academy (MJA) in 2000 and as a Foreign Associate of the United States National Academy of Sciences.

Early life and education
Takeichi was born in Aichi Prefecture, Japan, on November 27, 1943. He received his BSc in 1966 and MSc in 1968 from Nagoya University, and his Ph.D. in Biophysics from Kyoto University in 1973.

Academic career
In 1970 Takeichi became a member of the faculty of Kyoto University, and he served as Professor of Biophysics from 1986 to 2002. During his time at Kyoto, he studied abroad at the Carnegie Institute Department of Embryology for a fellowship. In 2000, he was appointed as Director of the RIKEN Center for Developmental Biology (RIKEN CDB).

Research contributions
In 1977 Takeichi discovered cadherin, and since then he has contributed to clarify its functions in tissue construction and to understand the molecular mechanisms of cell adhesion. After his discovery of cadherins, he continued to research cadherins and their properties. Along with cadherins, he also researched cell junctions and adhesions. He continues to research at RIKEN today.

Discovery of the Cadherin Family 
While first working in Kyoto, Takeichi was using trypsin to study cell adhesions and aggregation. Once he moved to the Carnegie Institution, he realized the trypsin he was using behaved differently. This trypsin solution contained EDTA, along with the trypsin, which disturbed adhesion. The EDTA sequesters calcium ions, so Takeichi began testing for adhesion dependent on calcium. He used Chinese Hamster V79 cells and treated them with a variety of treatments, including EDTA, trypsin + EDTA, and trypsin + calcium. Once treated, these cells were tested for aggregation levels. He found that both calcium dependent and calcium independent pathways existed, and that the calcium treatment prevent trypsin's effects on the cell.

Takeichi knew there was calcium dependent molecule that served an important role, but he had to find it. Rolf Kemler's anti serum was what helped him finally identify cadherin. E-cadherin was the first of the cadherin family to be discovered. During this research, Takeichi also observed changes in the morphology of the cells involved with adhesions. He accurately hypothesized that the adhesions dependent on calcium played a role in managing cells' morphogenetic behavior. His discovery of the cadherin family led to a developing field of studying adhesions pathways.

Other contributions 
Takeichi, along with other scientists, studied the mechanism behind hemagglutinin from Botulism and its effect on the epithelial barrier of the intestines. They found the hemagglutinin directly interacted with the e-cadherin in the epithelial cells to disturbed cell to cell adhesion. This interaction like cell to cell adhesion is dependent on calcium ions. An assay showed the hemaglutinin interaction is specific to e-cadherin.  

Outside of cadherin, Takeichi studied other molecules involved with cell adhesion and beyond. He studied alpha-catenin functions outside of their functions within cell adhesion. The results showed alpha-catenin have a variety of functions outside of cadherin and adhesion. It regulates multiple different molecules, like actin and RhoGEF.

Recognition
1994 Asahi Prize
1996 Japan Academy Prize
2001 Ross Harrison Prize, International Society of Developmental Biologists
2001 Keio Medical Science Prize
2004 Person of Cultural Merit
2005 Japan Prize
2012 Thomson Reuters Citation Laureates
2014 American Association for the Advancement of Science Fellow
2020 Canada Gairdner International Award.

Selected papers

External links
[www.japan-acad.go.jp/en/members/4/takeichi_masatoshi.html Masatoshi Takeichi, Japan Academy]
Masatoshi Takeichi, Foreign Associate of the National Academy of Sciences of U.S.A.

References

1943 births
Living people
Developmental biologists
Cell biologists
Japanese biologists
Academic staff of Kyoto University
Foreign associates of the National Academy of Sciences
People from Nagoya
Nagoya University alumni
Kyoto University alumni
Riken personnel